Bhogaraju is one of the Indian surnames.

 Bhogaraju Sesha Sailesh is a Smart Grid enthusiast and entrepreneur from POWERPET, AP, IN.
 Bhogaraju Narayana Murthy was an Indian writer and play writer.
 Bhogaraju Pattabhi Sitaramayya was an Indian independence activist and political leader in the state of Andhra Pradesh.
 Bhogaraju Ramana Rao is an Indian physician from Bangalore. AND?

Surnames of Indian origin